Tunisia competed at the 2016 Summer Paralympics in Rio de Janeiro, Brazil, from 7 September to 18 September 2016.

Background 
Tunisia finished the 2016 Games ranked third all time for total medals won by African countries, with 74 all time, of which 32 were gold, 28 silver and 14 bronze. They were ahead of fourth ranked Zimbabwe who had 23 gold, 26 silver and 20 bronze medals for a total of 69 medals. They were behind second ranked Egypt who had 143 total medals, 45 gold, 43 silver and 55 bronze.

Tunisia also finished number one in terms of total medals won by an African country in Rio. They won 19 total medals.  Their total number of gold medals, 7, put them second in Africa, behind Nigeria with 8.

Medalists

Gold medalists

Silver medalists

Bronze medalists

Athletics
Men
Track & road events

See also
Tunisia at the 2016 Summer Olympics

References

Nations at the 2016 Summer Paralympics
2016
2016 in Tunisian sport